Gyang is a Nigerian name that may refer to
Given name
Gyang Dalyop Datong (1959–2012), Nigerian senator
Gyang Pwajok (1966–2015), Nigerian politician

Surname
Jeremiah Gyang (born 1981), Nigerian singer-songwriter, instrumentalist and record producer
Kenneth Gyang, Nigerian filmmaker 
Ruby Gyang, Nigerian singer and songwriter

See also
Qungdo’gyang, a village in Tibet 
Giang (disambiguation)